The 2021–22 Colorado Buffaloes men's basketball team represented the University of Colorado Boulder in the 2021–22 NCAA Division I men's basketball season. They were led by head coach Tad Boyle in his twelfth season at Colorado. The Buffaloes played their home games at CU Events Center in Boulder, Colorado as members of the Pac-12 Conference. They finished the season 21–12, 12–8 in Pac-12 Play to finish in 4th place. They defeated Oregon in the quarterfinals of the Pac-12 tournament before losing in the semifinals to Arizona. They received an at-large bid to the National Invitation Tournament where they lost in the first round to St. Bonaventure.

Previous season
In a season limited due to the ongoing COVID-19 pandemic, the Buffaloes finished the 2019–20 season 23–9, 14–6 in Pac-12 play to finish in third place. They advanced to the championship game of the Pac-12 tournament where they lost to Oregon State. They received an at-large bid to the NCAA basketball tournament as the No. 5 seed in the East Region where defeated Georgetown in the first round before losing to Florida State in the second round.

Offseason

Departures

2021 recruiting class

2022 Recruiting class

Roster

Schedule and results

|-
!colspan=12 style=| Costa Rican exhibition trip

|-
!colspan=12 style=| Exhibition

|-
!colspan=12 style=| Regular season 

|-
!colspan=12 style=| Pac-12 tournament

|-
!colspan=12 style=| NIT tournament

Ranking movement

*AP does not release post-NCAA Tournament rankings.

References

Colorado
Colorado Buffaloes men's basketball seasons
Colorado Buffaloes
Colorado Buffaloes
Colorado